Tarrafal (also: Mangui or Mangue) is a city in the northern part of the island of Santiago, Cape Verde. In 2010 its population was 6,656. It is a fishing port situated on the northwestern coast. It constitutes the seat of the Tarrafal Municipality.

Geography

The city is situated by the Baía de Tarrafal, at the foot of 643 m high Monte Graciosa. Tarrafal is at the northern end of two main roads to Praia in the south, one leading through Assomada and São Domingos (EN1-ST01), the other along the east coast through Calheta de São Miguel and Pedra Badejo (EN1-ST02).

History

The origin of the name Tarrafal is the indigenous plant tarrafe, Tamarix senegalensis. The settlement was mentioned in the 1747 map by Jacques-Nicolas Bellin as "Terrafal". Tarrafal was the seat of the municipality of Santa Catarina from 1869 until 1912, when the seat was moved to Assomada. In 1917, the municipality of Tarrafal was separated from Santa Catarina, and the town Tarrafal became its seat. Between 1936 and 1974, political prisoners were held at the Tarrafal camp, south of the city. At least 32 prisoners died in the camp, which now houses a museum.

Demographics

See also
List of cities and towns in Cape Verde

References

Tarrafal Municipality
Cities in Cape Verde
Geography of Santiago, Cape Verde
Municipal seats in Cape Verde
Populated coastal places in Cape Verde